Nedeljko Piščević (born 20 April 1995) is a Serbian football midfielder who plays for Borac Banja Luka.

He made his Serbian Super Liga debut with FK Rad in July 2017.

References

1995 births
Living people
Footballers from Belgrade
Serbian footballers
Association football midfielders
FK Sinđelić Beograd players
FK Rad players
FK Javor Ivanjica players
Riga FC players
Serbian First League players
Serbian SuperLiga players
Latvian Higher League players
Serbian expatriate footballers
Expatriate footballers in Latvia
Serbian expatriate sportspeople in Latvia